Eshay is a slang expression associated with an Australian urban youth subculture that originated from Western Sydney in the late 1980s.

Description

The term can refer to individuals within the subculture, or to the subculture itself, and can have various other meanings in different contexts. The word "eshay" apparently derives from the Pig Latin for "sesh" (meaning drug or cannabis use session). The term "adlay", Pig Latin for "lad," refers to the same subculture. 

Eshays, or lads, are often considered stereotypically hypermasculine and inclined to crime and violence. They may be affiliated with other local youths from a postcode, hang out in groups, use slang derived from Pig Latin, wear sportswear, and engage in immature and anti-social behaviour. Common fashion items include bumbags and Nike shoes.

See also

 Chav/Roadman, a similar term used to describe young delinquents in Britain
 Gopnik, a similar term used to describe young delinquents in Eastern Europe
 Skeet (Newfoundland), a similar term used on the Canadian island of Newfoundland
 Hoon
 Lad culture

References 

Australian youth culture
Australian fringe and underground culture
Australian fashion
Criminal subcultures
Crime in Australia
Crime in Sydney
Street gangs
Socioeconomic stereotypes